Johann Christian (John) Heussler (1820–1907) was a businessman and politician in Queensland, Australia. He was a Member of the Queensland Legislative Council.

Early life
Johann Christian Heussler was born at Bockenheim, Frankfurt, Germany on 15 June 1820. He was educated at the state school, and was subsequently a student at a French institution at Bockenheim, and Dr. Jeiteles's Mercantile Institute at Frankfurt. He entered in business as a wine merchant at Frankfurt, and later on, while still young, received an important appointment in a mercantile firm in Holland, representing the firm at the London Exhibition in 1851. He emigrated to Australia in 1852, and established a business, in partnership with others, in Melbourne.

Business interests
Due to poor health he moved to Brisbane 1854 and established the mercantile firm Heussler and Co. Over two decades Heussler became a highly respected business man and citizen of Queensland. He was recognised as a founding member of the Queensland Club, Consul for the Netherlands, German Consul, and Emigration Agent for German shipping companies.

Politics
Heussler was appointed to the Queensland Legislative Council on 26 September 1866. Although a lifetime appointment, his seat was declared vacant on 8 October 1870 due to his absence from Queensland. However, he was reappointed on 13 December 1870 and remained on the Council until his death on 26 October 1907. As a member of the council, he acted as President, as (acting) Chairman of Committee, and as a Commissioner at the opening of Parliament at various times.

While Robert Herbert was Queensland Premier, John Heussler was sent to Germany as an immigration agent, resulting in prosperous German and Scandinavian (mainly Danish) settlements in the Rosewood, Logan River, Albert River, Darling Downs, Maryborough, Hervey Bay, Kolan and other districts.

Fernberg

In May 1860 Heusller purchased a portion of land (Portion 223) high on a hill on what was most likely undeveloped natural bushland (but later the suburb of Rosalie, now Paddington).
He purchased the adjoining Portion 291 two years later in partnership with George Reinhard Francksen. In 1864 Francksen died and the land passed to Heussler.

Heussler is believed to have built his home Fernberg on that land in 1865, giving it a name of German origin that meant "distant mountain". The design of the house is attributed to Benjamin Backhouse, an architect responsible for several substantial commissions in Queensland, New South Wales and Victoria. Local examples of his work include other villa residences such as Baroona, Cintra House, Riversleigh (on North Quay) for Edward Tufnell and Old Bishopsbourne. Due to financial difficulties, Heussler was forced to leave the property in 1872 and for the next five years Fernberg was leased. In November 1877 the estate was advertised for sale. The house and grounds were described as being:
"Built of brick and stone, being four stories high, having below kitchen and servants' room; on the ground floor spacious drawing, dining, and breakfast rooms; on the first floor three large bedrooms, and one large room on the second floor.  The roof is covered with slates, the verandahs and balconies being spacious, and presenting a delightful retreat for the enjoyment of pure air, shade and widespread and charming view. The grounds are all enclosed, the timber having been thinned so to give the place a park-like appearance, and there is a shrubbery and garden around the house."

In February 1910, the Queensland Government decided to lease Fernberg as a temporary residence for the Governor of Queensland following the formal dedication of the original Government House as the University of Queensland on 10 December 1909. At the same time, plans for a new Government House to be erected at Victoria Park were being prepared; however work on the new house never progressed beyond the construction of footings. In June 1911, despite reports that the residence was too small, the government purchased Fernberg as Queensland's Government House which it remains to this day (albeit considerably modified and extended over the years).

Later life
John Heussler died on Saturday 26 October 1907 at his home Unthank at Christian Street, Albion (now Clayfield). His funeral moved from his home to the Toowong Cemetery.

See also
 Members of the Queensland Legislative Council, 1860–1869; 1870–1879; 1880–1889; 1890–1899; 1900–1909

References

Attribution

Further reading
  — a book written by his great-grandson

External links 

Members of the Queensland Legislative Council
1820 births
1907 deaths
Articles incorporating text from the Queensland Heritage Register
Businesspeople from Frankfurt
Burials at Toowong Cemetery
19th-century Australian politicians
Pre-Separation Queensland